Mina Gajic is a musical artist and pianist known for her albums, Boundless: Schubert Sonatinas (2020), and Confluence: Balkan Dances & Tango Nuevo (2022). She is also the artistic director and executive director of Boulder Bach Festival held in Colorado.

Biography 

Gajic was born in Serbia, then Yugoslavia. She studied at the Academy of Fine Arts in Belgrade while in Europe and then moved to the US where she earned degrees at the University of Illinois at Urbana-Champaign, and the Shepherd School of Music at Rice University. Later she earned a Doctor of Musical Arts degree from the University of Colorado Boulder.

Since 2014, Gajic is associated with Colorado's Boulder Bach Festival where she currently serves as the artistic director and executive director. Boulder Bach Festival is an organization which started in 1981. It is a five chamber, choral, and orchestral concerts series with programs performed with period instruments since 2011.

Gajic is also the founder and Artistic Director of Boulder International Chamber Music Competition - Art of Duo. She has also taught at Sam Houston State University School of Music in Texas and at the University of St. Thomas Music Preparatory School in Minnesota.

Musical work 

Gajic has performed as a recitalist and concerto soloist in United States, Europe, China and Bolivia. Her notable performances include period instrument renditions of works by Antheil, Brahms, Britten, Berg, Bartók, Chopin and Ives. 

Along with duo partner and violinist Zachary Carrettín, she has released two albums on the Sono Luminus label, Boundless: Schubert Sonatinas (2020), and Confluence: Balkan Dances & Tango Nuevo (2022).

Awards 

For her performance, Gajic has been awarded at the International Competition Città di Stresa, Italy; at the Competition of the Federal Republic of Yugoslavia; at the Republic Competition of Serbia; at the Stanković Competition in Belgrade; the Nikolai Rubinstein Competition and at the Shanghai International Piano Competition.

References 

Serbian pianists

Year of birth missing (living people)
Living people